Kembrew McLeod is an American artist, activist, and professor of Communication Studies at the University of Iowa.

He is best known as a performance artist or "media prankster" who filed an application in 1997 to register the phrase "Freedom of Expression" as a trademark in the United States. This phrase was the name of his zine and artist book series, and on January 6, 1998, McLeod was granted registration no. 2127381 in Class 16 (for "booklets in the field of creative writing").

McLeod received his PhD from University of Massachusetts Amherst, an MA from the University of Virginia, and a BS from James Madison University.

Dispute with AT&T
McLeod sought registration of the phrase "Freedom of Expression" as a reflection on the use of intellectual property law to restrict cultural expression in U.S. society. In 2003, McLeod sent AT&T a cease and desist letter in response to an AT&T advertising campaign in college newspapers promoting a new long distance plan which used the phrase "freedom of expression". McLeod claimed that the use by AT&T of his registered trademark could lead some consumers to infer a connection between his publication and AT&T. The New York Times later interviewed McLeod, and reported that his aim was "to object to corporate power over words, speech and even ideas. 'I do want to register my genuine protest that a big company that really doesn't represent freedom of expression is trying to appropriate this phrase,' he said."

Registration no. 2127381 was cancelled in October 2004 when McLeod did not lodge documentary evidence with the United States Patent and Trademark Office to demonstrate that "Freedom of Expression" had been used as a trademark.

Protesting Bill Clinton over Sister Souljah controversy
On December 10, 2007, McLeod protested a Bill Clinton event in Iowa City, Iowa, dressed as a robot and demanding an apology for remarks made by Clinton in 1992 about controversial hip hop musician Sister Souljah. Before being removed by security and as he was led away, McLeod tossed multi-colored flyers into the air which included the name of a website, mr-ifobca.org, standing for "Mad Robots in Favor of Bill Clinton Apologizing."

Other work
McLeod's book built upon the themes raised by the AT&T event and develops a serious critique on a range of diverse topics such as hip-hop music and sampling, the patenting of seeds and human genes, folk and blues music, visual collage art, electronic voting, and computer software, among other things.

McLeod has also written music criticism for Rolling Stone, The Village Voice, Spin, and Mojo. He is the coproducer of a 2001 documentary film on the music industry, Money for Nothing: Behind the Business of Pop Music, which he produced for the Media Education Foundation. He is currently working on another documentary on the history of sound collage, digital sampling, and intellectual property law, titled Copyright Criminals: This Is a Sampling Sport.

He participated in the exhibition "Illegal Art: Freedom of Expression in the Corporate Age," which was hosted by the San Francisco Museum of Modern Art's Artist Gallery. In 2005, he helped co-found the Freedom of Expression® Security Consortium, which is dedicated to "Regulating Freedom of Expression in the Marketplace of Ideas".  He also is co-editor (with Ted Striphas) of a 2006 special issue of the journal Cultural Studies on "The Politics of Intellectual Properties," which is available for free on the internet.

His book, Freedom of Expression, is available as a free PDF download with a Creative Commons license.

In 2012, one chapter from Freedom of Expression was used as the basis for two essays in the United States Pirate Party's book, No Safe Harbor.

See also
Idea-expression divide

References

Further reading 
 
  ZIP download
  PDF download

External links

 Kembrew McLeod Homepage
 Kembrew McLeod faculty page at University of Iowa
 Freedom of Expression® Security Consortium
 Copyright Criminals movie site
Interview with Kembrew McLeod/Copyright Criminals - small WORLD Podcast 2006
 Cultural Studies special issue on the "Politics of Intellectual Properties"

American male journalists
University of Iowa faculty
Copyright activists
Free speech activists
Living people
University of Massachusetts Amherst alumni
University of Virginia alumni
James Madison University alumni
Creative Commons-licensed authors
Year of birth missing (living people)